The Herzogstand Cable Car  was built in 1994 as replacement for a  chair lift through the Bavarian alps. Its two cabins carry passengers from the village of Walchensee ( above NN) to the Fahrenberg mountain ( above NN) on the upper slopes of the Herzogstand mountain. The cableway uses a  carrying cable and a  hauling cable. The cable car is driven by a 185 kilowatt engine.

External links
Official home page 
History of the Tramway 

Cable cars in Germany
Buildings and structures in Bad Tölz-Wolfratshausen
1994 establishments in Germany